Mananara Avaratra is a district of Analanjirofo in Madagascar.

Communes
The district is further divided into 16 communes:

 Ambatoharanana
 Ambodiampana
 Ambodivoanio
 Analanampotsy
 Andasibe
 Antanambaobe
 Antanambe
 Antanananivo
 Imorona
 Mahanoro
 Manambolosy
 Mananara Nord
 Sandrakatsy
 Saromaona
 Tanibe
 Vanono

References 

Districts of Analanjirofo